Alexis Vital Joseph, Baron of Bruix, (Brest, France, 1790 - Callao, Peru, 1825), Alejo Bruix in Spanish, was French military who joined to the patriot armies to fought in the Spanish American Wars of Independence.

Son of Étienne Eustache Bruix, Admiral of the French Navy. Alexis was in the Napoleonic campaigns in the 5th Regiment of Chasseurs a Cheval (Horse Hunters).  After the Battle of Waterloo went to Buenos Aires, where he arrived on June 14, 1818. This year Alexis was sent to fight in the Army of the Andes, in the Regiment of Horse Grenadiers. He participated in the Battle of Chacabuco, battles of Cancharayada and Maipú. And in the campaign in southern Chile fought the Battle of Bío Bío.

Alejo joined to General Jose de San Martin in Freedom Expedition of Peru. He made the campaign of Quito with Juan Lavalle, with battles of Riobamba and Pichincha and was promoted to lieutenant colonel. Back in Peru, joined to the Army of Bolívar as Colonel, and fought in the campaigns of Junin and Ayacucho in 1824. He died in the siege of el Callao in 1825.

References 
Memorias Militares. Jorge Beauchef

1790 births
1825 deaths